Paul Aigbogun is a Nigerian football manager.

Career

For the 2002 season, Aigbogun signed for American third division club Northern Nevada Aces, before spending the rest of his playing career in the United States with lower league sides Nevada Wonders and San Francisco Seals.

After retiring, he had 2 spells as head coach of Warri Wolves in the Nigerian top flight.

In 2016, he was appointed head coach of Enyimba International, the most successful Nigerian team. From there, Aigbogun was appointed head coach of the Nigeria under-20 national team.

In 2019, he was accused of receiving bribes from players to be selected for the Nigeria under-20 national team.

In August 2022 he was named new manager of Danish 2nd Division side Jammerbugt FC.

References

English football managers
Living people
English footballers
1972 births
Gibraltar National League managers
Association footballers not categorized by position